The Chechnya constituency (No.36) is a Russian legislative constituency covering the entirety of Chechnya.

Members elected

Election results

1993
The Government of secessionist Chechen Republic of Ichkeria declined to take part in a State Duma election.

1995

|-
! colspan=2 style="background-color:#E9E9E9;text-align:left;vertical-align:top;" |Candidate
! style="background-color:#E9E9E9;text-align:left;vertical-align:top;" |Party
! style="background-color:#E9E9E9;text-align:right;" |Votes
! style="background-color:#E9E9E9;text-align:right;" |%
|-
|style="background-color:"|
|align=left|Ibragim Suleymenov
|align=left|Independent
|
|37.85%
|-
|style="background-color:#F5A222"|
|align=left|Aslambek Aslakhanov
|align=left|Interethnic Union
|
|25.23%
|-
|style="background-color:"|
|align=left|Badrudi Dzhamalkhanov
|align=left|Independent
|
|19.97%
|-
|style="background-color:"|
|align=left|Alash Saykhanov
|align=left|Agrarian Party
|
|7.50%
|-
|style="background-color:#016436"|
|align=left|Ibragim Galayev
|align=left|Nur
|
|3.78%
|-
|style="background-color:"|
|align=left|Sainkhasan Abdulmazhidov
|align=left|Independent
|
|2.16%
|-
|style="background-color:#000000"|
|colspan=2 |against all
|
|1.85%
|-
| colspan="5" style="background-color:#E9E9E9;"|
|- style="font-weight:bold"
| colspan="3" style="text-align:left;" | Total
| 
| 100%
|-
| colspan="5" style="background-color:#E9E9E9;"|
|- style="font-weight:bold"
| colspan="4" |Source:
|
|}

1999
State Duma election was not held due to continuing infighting in the region.

2000

|-
! colspan=2 style="background-color:#E9E9E9;text-align:left;vertical-align:top;" |Candidate
! style="background-color:#E9E9E9;text-align:left;vertical-align:top;" |Party
! style="background-color:#E9E9E9;text-align:right;" |Votes
! style="background-color:#E9E9E9;text-align:right;" |%
|-
|style="background-color:"|
|align=left|Aslambek Aslakhanov
|align=left|Independent
|
|30.31%
|-
|style="background-color:"|
|align=left|Shamalu Deniyev
|align=left|Independent
|
|19.91%
|-
|style="background-color:"|
|align=left|Bekkhan Khazbulatov
|align=left|Independent
|
|9.91%
|-
|style="background-color:"|
|align=left|Lechi Magomadov
|align=left|Independent
|
|9.75%
|-
|style="background-color:"|
|align=left|Khozh-Magomed Arsanov
|align=left|Independent
|
|7.49%
|-
|style="background-color:"|
|align=left|Iysa Ibragimov
|align=left|Independent
|
|3.78%
|-
|style="background-color:"|
|align=left|Amin Osmayev
|align=left|Independent
|
|3.35%
|-
|style="background-color:"|
|align=left|Ismail Kasumov
|align=left|Independent
|
|3.14%
|-
|style="background-color:"|
|align=left|Malika Gezimiyeva
|align=left|Independent
|
|2.05%
|-
|style="background-color:"|
|align=left|Ibragim Galayev
|align=left|Independent
|
|1.43%
|-
|style="background-color:"|
|align=left|Suleyman Makhmatkhadzhiyev
|align=left|Independent
|
|1.28%
|-
|style="background-color:"|
|align=left|Shuddi Visaitov
|align=left|Independent
|
|1.08%
|-
|style="background-color:"|
|align=left|Visit Saraliyev
|align=left|Independent
|
|0.63%
|-
|style="background-color:#000000"|
|colspan=2 |against all
|
|3.85%
|-
| colspan="5" style="background-color:#E9E9E9;"|
|- style="font-weight:bold"
| colspan="3" style="text-align:left;" | Total
| 
| 100%
|-
| colspan="5" style="background-color:#E9E9E9;"|
|- style="font-weight:bold"
| colspan="4" |Source:
|
|}

2003

|-
! colspan=2 style="background-color:#E9E9E9;text-align:left;vertical-align:top;" |Candidate
! style="background-color:#E9E9E9;text-align:left;vertical-align:top;" |Party
! style="background-color:#E9E9E9;text-align:right;" |Votes
! style="background-color:#E9E9E9;text-align:right;" |%
|-
|style="background-color:"|
|align=left|Akhmar Zavgayev
|align=left|Independent
|
|49.21%
|-
|style="background-color:"|
|align=left|Bekkhan Khazbulatov
|align=left|Independent
|
|13.59%
|-
|style="background-color:"|
|align=left|Salambek Maidov
|align=left|Independent
|
|13.23%
|-
|style="background-color:"|
|align=left|Alaudi Musayev
|align=left|Independent
|
|13.06%
|-
|style="background-color:"|
|align=left|Amin Osmayev
|align=left|National Patriotic Forces
|
|3.32%
|-
|style="background-color:"|
|align=left|Milan Saydulayev
|align=left|Independent
|
|2.99%
|-
|style="background-color:#004090"|
|align=left|Gersolt Elmurzayev
|align=left|New Course — Automobile Russia
|
|1.86%
|-
|style="background-color:#000000"|
|colspan=2 |against all
|
|1.61%
|-
| colspan="5" style="background-color:#E9E9E9;"|
|- style="font-weight:bold"
| colspan="3" style="text-align:left;" | Total
| 
| 100%
|-
| colspan="5" style="background-color:#E9E9E9;"|
|- style="font-weight:bold"
| colspan="4" |Source:
|
|}

2016

|-
! colspan=2 style="background-color:#E9E9E9;text-align:left;vertical-align:top;" |Candidate
! style="background-color:#E9E9E9;text-align:leftt;vertical-align:top;" |Party
! style="background-color:#E9E9E9;text-align:right;" |Votes
! style="background-color:#E9E9E9;text-align:right;" |%
|-
|style="background-color:"|
|align=left|Adam Delimkhanov
|align=left|United Russia
|
|93.24%
|-
|style="background-color:"|
|align=left|Ruslan Avkhadov
|align=left|Communist Party
|
|2.98%
|-
|style="background:"| 
|align=left|Ismail Denilkhanov
|align=left|A Just Russia
|
|2.36%
|-
|style="background-color:"|
|align=left|Albina Fatullayeva
|align=left|Liberal Democratic Party
|
|0.88%
|-
|style="background-color: " |
|align=left|Maksim Chuvashov
|align=left|Communists of Russia
|
|0.47%
|-
| colspan="5" style="background-color:#E9E9E9;"|
|- style="font-weight:bold"
| colspan="3" style="text-align:left;" | Total
| 
| 100%
|-
| colspan="5" style="background-color:#E9E9E9;"|
|- style="font-weight:bold"
| colspan="4" |Source:
|
|}

2021

|-
! colspan=2 style="background-color:#E9E9E9;text-align:left;vertical-align:top;" |Candidate
! style="background-color:#E9E9E9;text-align:left;vertical-align:top;" |Party
! style="background-color:#E9E9E9;text-align:right;" |Votes
! style="background-color:#E9E9E9;text-align:right;" |%
|-
|style="background-color:"|
|align=left|Adam Delimkhanov (incumbent)
|align=left|United Russia
|
|93.59%
|-
|style="background-color: " |
|align=left|Isa Khadzhimuradov
|align=left|A Just Russia — For Truth
|
|2.08%
|-
|style="background-color:"|
|align=left|Khasmagomed Deniyev
|align=left|Communist Party
|
|1.77%
|-
|style="background-color: "|
|align=left|Umar Edelkhanov
|align=left|Party of Pensioners
|
|1.03%
|-
|style="background:"| 
|align=left|Sultan Khiziriyev
|align=left|Civic Platform
|
|0.79%
|-
|style="background-color:"|
|align=left|Khasan Abdulkadyrov
|align=left|The Greens
|
|0.52%
|-
|style="background-color:"|
|align=left|Albina Fatullayeva
|align=left|Liberal Democratic Party
|
|0.15%
|-
| colspan="5" style="background-color:#E9E9E9;"|
|- style="font-weight:bold"
| colspan="3" style="text-align:left;" | Total
| 
| 100%
|-
| colspan="5" style="background-color:#E9E9E9;"|
|- style="font-weight:bold"
| colspan="4" |Source:
|
|}

Notes

References

Russian legislative constituencies
Politics of Chechnya